Raquel Martínez (born 15 May 1908, date of death unknown) was a Chilean sprinter. She competed in the women's 100 metres at the 1936 Summer Olympics. She was the first woman to represent Chile at the Olympics.

References

External links
 

1908 births
Year of death missing
Athletes (track and field) at the 1936 Summer Olympics
Chilean female sprinters
Olympic athletes of Chile
Place of birth missing
Central American and Caribbean Games medalists in athletics
Olympic female sprinters
20th-century Chilean women